Dera Murad Jamali, often abbreviated as D.M. Jamali, is a city (and district headquarters) located in Nasirabad District, Balochistan, Pakistan. It is also the divisional headquarters of Nasirabad Division.

References

Populated places in Nasirabad District